Un Baiser Volé is a 2000 Hong Kong romantic comedy film written by Patrick Kong and Manfred Wong, and produced by Chiu Fu-Sheng and Manfred Wong. The film stars Christy Chung, Stephen Fung, Natalie Ng, and Crystal Cheung Yee Tung.

Plot
Stephen Lee was accepted to the university after the college entrance examination. He has a girlfriend Wu Shude, who is his first love, they fell in love for seven years, and they don't have premarital sex.

Stephen Lee dates Amy in the university, and they have sex frequently, he became a promiscuity man. When Amy finds him cheating they break up. He also falls in love with his French teacher, Sophia, but Sophia has a foreign boyfriend.

After a period of time, Stephen Lee breaks up with Wu Shude, then she was married to a doctor. A year later, Sophia left Hong Kong for France.

Cast
 Christy Chung as Sophia, a college teacher.
 Stephen Fung as Stephen Lee, a college student.
 Natalie Ng as Amy, Stephen Lee's girlfriend.
 Crystal Cheung Yee Tung as Wu Shude, Stephen Lee's first Love.
 Sheung Mo Lam as Sophia's foreign boyfriend.

References

External links

2000s Mandarin-language films
Hong Kong romantic comedy films
2000 romantic comedy films
2000 films
2000s Hong Kong films